Wacousta is an 1832 novel by John Richardson. It may also refer to:

Wacousta, Michigan, United States, an unincorporated community and census-designated place
Wacousta Township, Humboldt County, Iowa, United States
Wacousta Hill, a mountain ridge in Hampshire County, West Virginia, United States
, a Norwegian cargo ship, built in 1908 and sunk on 8 November 1915 by